Elachista gilvula is a moth of the family Elachistidae. It is found in Kazakhstan and Russia (Tuva). The habitat consists of xerothermic nanophyton steppes.

The wingspan is 8.5–9.5 mm. The forewing ground colour is creamy white with creamy white fringe scales and a few dark tipped scales, as well as an indistinct fringe line formed of dark tipped broader fringe scales. The basal third of the costa is narrowly black. The hindwings are grey, with yellowish grey fringe scales.

References

gilvula
Moths described in 2012
Moths of Asia